The Grace Memorial Episcopal Church is a historic church in Wabasha, Minnesota, United States, built in 1900.  The building was listed on the National Register of Historic Places in 1982 for having local significance in the themes of architecture and religion.  It was nominated for being "the most distinguished ecclesiastical structure" in Wabasha and "the work of prominent Minnesota architect Cass Gilbert".

Description
Grace Memorial Episcopal Church is a one-story building on a modified cruciform plan.  It was designed in the style of English Gothic architecture, with walls of random coursed stone.  The main gable ends have stone coping topped by Celtic crosses at the peaks.  The roof is of slate.

There are two projecting gables on the main façade that contain doors.  The gable at main entrance has a decorated bargeboard, a Gothic arch, and a belfry.  The gable over the secondary entrance has half-timbering over cobblestone infill.

The building is characterized by several stained glass windows in Gothic framing, flanked by stone buttresses.  The largest such window is on the northwest wall, but the chancel window at the southeast, entitled "Three Marys at the Tomb", was designed by Tiffany Studios.  It depicts the Virgin Mary, and Mary Magdalene at the tomb on Easter morning.  The window cost $3000.

History
This building was commissioned by Saint Paul-based lumberman Thomas Irvine to replace an existing church in Wabasha while serving as a memorial to his wife Emily Hills Irvine and her parents.  Her father Horace Hills had been the reverend of the original Grace Episcopal Church from 1872 to 1877.

See also
 List of Anglican churches
 National Register of Historic Places listings in Wabasha County, Minnesota

References

External links
 

1900 establishments in Minnesota
Buildings and structures in Wabasha County, Minnesota
Cass Gilbert buildings
Churches completed in 1900
Churches on the National Register of Historic Places in Minnesota
Episcopal church buildings in Minnesota
Gothic Revival church buildings in Minnesota
National Register of Historic Places in Wabasha County, Minnesota
Stone churches in Minnesota
Wabasha, Minnesota